Pitka (also Romanized as Pītkā; also known as Petkā) is a village in Babol Kenar Rural District, Babol Kenar District, Babol County, Mazandaran Province, Iran. At the 2006 census, its population was 251, in 66 families.

References 

Populated places in Babol County